The 2017 FIVB Volleyball Women's U20 World Championship was the nineteenth edition of the international volleyball tournament and the world championship for women's national teams under the age of 20, organized by the sport's world governing body, FIVB. The tournament was hosted by Mexico in the cities of Boca del Río and Córdoba from 14 to 23 July 2017.

China defeated Russia in the final to capture their third title in the competition. Japan won the bronze medal after defeating Turkey in the third place match. Yang Hanyu from China was elected the Most Valuable Player.

Qualification
The FIVB Sports Events Council revealed a proposal to streamline the number of teams participating in the Age Group World Championships.

Pools composition
The drawing of lots was held in Boca del Rio, Mexico on 8 June 2017. Mexico as a host country team were seeded in the top position of pool A, And the top seven teams from World ranking as per January 2017 were seed in serpentine system in first two rows. the eight remaining teams were drawn in next two rows. Numbers in brackets denote the World ranking.

Squads

Pool standing procedure
 Number of matches won
 Match points
 Sets ratio
 Points ratio
 If the tie continues as per the point ratio between two teams, the priority will be given to the team which won the last match between them. When the tie in points ratio is between three or more teams, a new classification of these teams in the terms of points 1, 2 and 3 will be made taking into consideration only the matches in which they were opposed to each other.
Match won 3–0 or 3–1: 3 match points for the winner, 0 match points for the loser
Match won 3–2: 2 match points for the winner, 1 match point for the loser

First round
All times are Central Daylight Time Zone (UTC−05:00).

Pool A

|}

|}

Pool B

|}

|}

Pool C

|}

|}

Pool D

|}

|}

Second round
All times are Central Daylight Time Zone (UTC−05:00).

Pool E

|}

|}

Pool F

|}

|}

Pool G

|}

|}

Pool H

|}

|}

Final round
All times are Central Daylight Time Zone (UTC−05:00).

Classification 13th–16th

13th–16th semifinals

|}

15th place match

|}

13th place match

|}

Classification 9th–12th

9th–12th semifinals

|}

11th place match

|}

9th place match

|}

Classification 5th–8th

5th–8th semifinals

|}

7th place match

|}

5th place match

|}

Final four

Semifinals

|}

3rd place match

|}

Final

|}

Final standing

Awards 

Most Valuable Player
 Yang Hanyu 
Best Setter
 Tamaki Matsui
Best Outside Spikers
 Wu Han 
 Tuğba Şenoğlu

Best Middle Blockers
 Zehra Güneş
 Yang Hanyu 
Best Opposite Spiker
 Anna Kotikova
Best Libero
 Nyeme Costa

See also
2017 FIVB Volleyball Men's U21 World Championship

References

External links
Official website

FIVB Volleyball Women's U20 World Championship
FIVB Volleyball Women's U20 World Championship
International volleyball competitions hosted by Mexico
2017 in Mexican sports
July 2017 sports events in Mexico
2017 in Mexican women's sports